The London Women's Sevens is part of the London Sevens, and was first played in 2012 when the IRB promoted a Women's Challenge tournament that was hosted alongside the existing men's tournament.

In 2013 the tournament was an invitational event organised and sponsored by the RFU. The tournament was not held in 2014, but was reinstituted for the 2015 season as the first edition of the London Sevens to be a part of the World Rugby Women's Sevens Series.

Results

2012: IRB Women's Challenge
Twickenham, London 12–13 May 2012

Group A

 26 - 5 
 28 - 17 
 41 - 0 
 21 - 12 
 22 - 0 
 19 - 14 

Group B

 14 - 15 
 19 - 10 
 54 - 0 
 0 - 19 
 29-0 
 5 - 24 

Plate Semi Finals (5th-8th)
 19-14 
 14-19 

7th/8th Match 
 14-7 

Plate final: 5th/6th Match 
 7-22 

Group C

 27 - 5 
 7 - 12 
 29 - 0 
 50 - 0 
 22 - 5 
 24 - 5 

Bowl Semi Finals (9th-12th)
 10-26 
 14-33 

11th/12th Match 
 19-17 

Bowl final:9th/10th Match 
 5-43 

Quarter-finals (1st-8th)
 19-10 
 17-0 
 10-0 
 19-0 

Cup Semi Finals (1st-4th)
 17-12  (AET)
 14-12 

3rd/4th place
 19-14 

Cup Final: 1st/2nd place
 34-7

2013: Women's Invitational Sevens
Twickenham, London 11–12 May 2013

Pool A

 38-0 
 12-14 
 17-5 
 33-0 
 7-0 
 19-20 

Plate Semi Finals (5th-8th)
 12-14 
 7-12 

Plate final: 5th/6th Match 
 26-0 

Pool B

 12-5 
 22-5 
 14-17 
 17-0 
 24-10 
 10-5 

Quarter-finals (1st-8th)
 15-7 
 33-7 
 12-0 
 12-7 

Cup Semi Finals (1st-4th)
 28-7 
 17-12 

Cup Final: 1st/2nd place
 36-7

References

Women
World Rugby Women's Sevens Series tournaments
Rugby sevens competitions in Europe
2012 establishments in England
Recurring sporting events established in 2012
Women's sport in London